Municipalities in Croatia (plural: općine) are the second-lowest administrative unit of government in the country, and along with cities and towns (grad, plural: gradovi) they form the second level of administrative subdisivion, after counties.

Though equal in powers and administrative bodies, municipalities and towns differ in that municipalities are usually more likely to consist of a collection of villages in rural or suburban areas, whereas towns are more likely to cover urbanised areas. Croatian law defines municipalities as local self-government units which are established, in an area where several inhabited settlements represent a natural, economic and social entity, related to one other by the common interests of the area's population.

As of 2017, the 21 counties of Croatia are subdivided into 128 towns and 428 municipalities.

Tasks and organization 
Municipalities, within their self-governing scope of activities, perform the tasks of local significance, which directly fulfil the citizens’ needs, and which were not assigned to the state bodies by the constitution or law, and in particular affairs related to the organization of localities and housing, zoning and planning, public utilities, child care, social welfare, primary health services, education and primary schools, culture, physical education and sports, customer protection, protection and improvement of the environment, fire protection and civil defence, and local transport.

Municipality government 

Municipal council (općinsko vijeće) is the representative body of citizens and the body of local self-government. The councillors are elected for a four-year term on the basis of universal suffrage in direct elections by secret ballot using proportional system with the D'Hondt method. The executive head of the municipality is the municipality president (općinski načelnik), also elected in direct elections for a four-year term, by majority vote (two-round system) (the deputy president is elected together with the president). They (with the deputy president) can be recalled by a referendum. Municipalities have administrative departments as offices of municipal administration (in small municipalities there is unique administrative department) chaired by the heads (principals). They are appointed by the municipal president on the basis of a public competition.

Croatian municipalities are administratively subdivided into "local committee areas" (mjesni odbori) with elected councils.

List of municipalities

, there are 428 municipalities in Croatia.

Continental Croatia

Koprivnica-Križevci County

 Drnje
 Đelekovec
 Ferdinandovac
 Gola 
 Gornja Rijeka
 Hlebine
 Kalinovac
 Kalnik
 Kloštar Podravski
 Koprivnički Bregi
 Koprivnički Ivanec
 Legrad
 Molve
 Novigrad Podravski
 Novo Virje           
 Peteranec
 Podravske Sesvete
 Rasinja
 Sokolovac                           
 Sveti Ivan Žabno
 Sveti Petar Orehovec
 Virje

Krapina-Zagorje County

 Bedekovčina
 Budinščina
 Desinić
 Đurmanec 
 Gornja Stubica
 Hrašćina
 Hum na Sutli
 Jesenje
 Kraljevec na Sutli
 Krapinske Toplice
 Konjščina
 Kumrovec
 Lobor
 Marija Bistrica
 Mače           
 Mihovljan
 Novi Golubovec
 Petrovsko
 Radoboj                           
 Sveti Križ Začretje
 Stubičke Toplice
 Tuhelj                           
 Veliko Trgovišće
 Zagorska Sela  
 Zlatar-Bistrica

Međimurje County

 Belica
 Dekanovec
 Domašinec
 Donja Dubrava 
 Donji Kraljevec
 Donji Vidovec
 Goričan
 Gornji Mihaljevec
 Kotoriba
 Mala Subotica
 Nedelišće
 Orehovica
 Podturen
 Pribislavec
 Selnica           
 Strahoninec
 Sveta Marija
 Sveti Juraj na Bregu
 Sveti Martin na Muri                           
 Šenkovec
 Štrigova
 Vratišinec

Varaždin County

 Bednja
 Beretinec
 Breznica
 Breznički Hum 
 Cestica
 Donja Voća
 Gornji Kneginec
 Jalžabet
 Klenovnik
 Ljubešćica
 Mali Bukovec
 Martijanec
 Maruševec
 Petrijanec
 Sračinec           
 Sveti Đurđ
 Sveti Ilija
 Trnovec Bartolovečki
 Veliki Bukovec                           
 Vidovec
 Vinica
 Visoko

Zagreb County

 Bedenica
 Bistra
 Brckovljani
 Brdovec
 Dubrava
 Dubravica
 Farkaševac
 Gradec
 Jakovlje
 Klinča Sela
 Kloštar Ivanić
 Krašić
 Kravarsko
 Križ
 Luka
 Marija Gorica
 Orle
 Pisarovina
 Pokupsko
 Preseka
 Pušća
 Rakovec
 Rugvica
 Stupnik
 Žumberak

Bjelovar-Bilogora County

 Berek
 Dežanovac
 Đulovac
 Hercegovac 
 Ivanska
 Kapela
 Končanica
 Nova Rača
 Rovišće
 Severin
 Sirač
 Šandrovac
 Štefanje
 Velika Pisanica
 Velika Trnovitica           
 Veliki Grđevac
 Veliko Trojstvo
 Zrinski Topolovac
 Poljska je Hrvatska

Brod-Posavina County

 Bebrina
 Brodski Stupnik
 Bukovlje
 Cernik
 Davor
 Donji Andrijevci
 Dragalić
 Garčin
 Gornja Vrba
 Gornji Bogićevci
 Gundinci
 Klakar
 Nova Kapela
 Okučani
 Oprisavci           
 Oriovac
 Podcrkavlje
 Rešetari
 Sibinj
 Sikirevci
 Slavonski Šamac
 Stara Gradiška
 Staro Petrovo Selo
 Velika Kopanica
 Vrbje
 Vrpolje

Karlovac County

 Barilović
 Bosiljevo
 Cetingrad
 Draganić
 Generalski Stol
 Josipdol
 Kamanje
Krnjak
 Lasinja
 Netretić
 Plaški
 Rakovica
 Ribnik
 Saborsko
 Tounj
 Vojnić
 Žakanje

Osijek-Baranja County

 Antunovac
 Bilje
 Bizovac
 Čeminac
 Čepin
 Darda
 Donja Motičina
 Draž
 Drenje
 Đurđenovac           
 Erdut
 Ernestinovo
 Feričanci
 Gorjani
 Jagodnjak
 Kneževi Vinogradi
 Koška
 Levanjska Varoš
 Magadenovac
 Marijanci
 Petlovac    
 Petrijevci
 Podravska Moslavina
 Podgorač           
 Popovac
 Punitovci
 Satnica Đakovačka
 Semeljci
 Strizivojna
 Šodolovci
 Trnava
 Viljevo
 Viškovci
 Vladislavci
 Vuka

Požega-Slavonia County

 Brestovac
 Čaglin
 Jakšić
 Kaptol 
 Velika

Sisak-Moslavina County

 Donji Kukuruzari
 Dvor
 Gvozd
 Hrvatska Dubica 
 Jasenovac
 Lekenik
 Lipovljani
 Majur
 Martinska Ves
 Sunja
 Topusko
 Velika Ludina

Virovitica-Podravina County

 Crnac
 Čačinci
 Čađavica
 Gradina 
 Lukač
 Mikleuš
 Nova Bukovica
 Pitomača
 Sopje
 Suhopolje
 Špišić Bukovica
 Voćin
 Zdenci

Vukovar-Srijem County

Andrijaševci
Babina Greda
Bogdanovci
Borovo
Bošnjaci
Cerna
Drenovci
Gradište
Gunja
Ivankovo
Jarmina
Lovas
Markušica
Negoslavci
Nijemci
Nuštar
Privlaka
Stari Jankovci
Stari Mikanovci
Štitar
Tompojevci    
Tordinci
Tovarnik           
Trpinja
Vođinci
Vrbanja

Adriatic Croatia

Dubrovnik-Neretva County

 Blato
 Dubrovačko Primorje
 Janjina                 
 Konavle
 Kula Norinska
 Lastovo      
 Lumbarda
 Mljet   
 Orebić
 Pojezerje
 Slivno   
 Smokvica
 Ston    
 Trpanj
 Vela Luka
 Zažablje
 Župa Dubrovačka

Istria County

 Bale 
 Barban 
 Brtonigla 
 Cerovlje 
 Fažana 
 Funtana 
 Gračišće 
 Grožnjan 
 Kanfanar 
 Karojba 
 Kaštelir-Labinci 
 Kršan 
 Lanišće 
 Ližnjan 
 Lupoglav 
 Marčana
 Medulin          
 Motovun 
 Oprtalj
 Pićan 
 Raša                        
 Sveta Nedelja 
 Sveti Lovreč
 Sveti Petar u Šumi                          
 Svetvinčenat
 Tar-Vabriga
 Tinjan
 Višnjan
 Vižinada 
 Vrsar
 Žminj

Lika-Senj County

 Brinje
 Donji Lapac
 Karlobag
 Lovinac
 Perušić
 Plitvička Jezera
 Udbina
 Vrhovine

Primorje-Gorski Kotar County

 Baška
 Brod Moravice
 Čavle
 Dobrinj
 Fužine
 Jelenje
 Klana
 Kostrena
 Lokve
 Lopar
 Lovran
 Malinska-Dubašnica
 Matulji
 Mošćenička Draga
 Mrkopalj
 Omišalj
 Punat
 Ravna Gora
 Skrad
 Vinodol
 Viškovo
 Vrbnik

Šibenik-Knin County

 Bilice
 Biskupija
 Civljane
 Ervenik
 Kijevo
 Kistanje
 Murter-Kornati
 Pirovac
 Primošten
 Promina
 Rogoznica
 Ružić
 Tisno
 Unešić
 Tribunj

Split-Dalmatia County

 Baška Voda
 Bol
 Brela
 Cista Provo
 Dicmo 
 Dugi Rat
 Dugopolje
 Gradac
 Hrvace
 Jelsa
 Klis
 Lećevica
 Lokvičići
 Lovreć           
 Marina
 Milna
 Muć
 Nerežišća
 Okrug                           
 Otok Dalmatinski
 Podbablje
 Podgora                           
 Podstrana
 Postira  
 Prgomet  
 Primorski Dolac
 Proložac
 Pučišća
 Runovići
 Seget
 Selca
 Sućuraj
 Sutivan
 Šestanovac
 Šolta
 Tučepi
 Zadvarje
 Zagvozd 
 Zmijavci

Zadar County

 Bibinje
 Galovac
 Gračac
 Jasenice
 Kali
 Kolan
 Kukljica
 Lišane Ostrovičke
 Novigrad
 Pakoštane
 Pašman
 Polača
 Poličnik
 Posedarje
 Povljana
 Preko
 Privlaka
 Ražanac
 Sali
 Stankovci
 Starigrad
 Sukošan
 Sveti Filip i Jakov
 Škabrnja
 Tkon
 Vir
 Vrsi
 Zemunik Donji

See also
Administrative divisions of Croatia
List of cities and towns in Croatia
Association of Municipalities of the Republic of Croatia
Joint Council of Municipalities
Cadastral community

References

 
Subdivisions of Croatia
Croatia, Municipalities
Croatia 2
Municipalities, Croatia
Municipalities
Croatia